The White Mountain Trail is a National Scenic Byway in the U.S. state of New Hampshire. It travels through the heart of the White Mountains crossing three major mountain passes. Despite the name it is a scenic byway accessible by car and not a hiking trail.

The trail includes sections of U.S. Route 3 and US 302, between Lincoln and Conway, connecting at both ends with the Kancamagus Highway (part of New Hampshire Route 112). It also includes a branch which travels south from Bartlett to the Kancamagus over Bear Notch. The byway is primarily in the White Mountain National Forest but also traverses Franconia Notch State Park and Crawford Notch State Park.

See also

References 

New Hampshire highways
National Scenic Byways
National Forest Scenic Byways
Transportation in Grafton County, New Hampshire
Transportation in Carroll County, New Hampshire
Transportation in Coös County, New Hampshire
Tourist attractions in Carroll County, New Hampshire
Tourist attractions in Coös County, New Hampshire
Tourist attractions in Grafton County, New Hampshire
U.S. Route 3